The 2000 Ondrej Nepela Memorial was the 8th edition of an annual senior-level international figure skating competition held in Bratislava, Slovakia. Skaters competed in four disciplines: men's singles, ladies' singles, pair skating, and ice dancing. The competition is named for 1972 Olympic gold medalist Ondrej Nepela.

Results

Men

Ladies

Pairs

Ice dancing

External links
 8th Ondrej Nepela Memorial

Ondrej Nepela Memorial, 2000
Ondrej Nepela Memorial
Ondrej Nepela Memorial, 2000